The men's lightweight event was part of the boxing programme at the 1936 Summer Olympics. The weight class was the fourth-lightest contested, and allowed boxers of up to 135 pounds (61.2 kilograms). The competition was held from Tuesday, August 11, 1936 to Saturday, August 15, 1936. Twenty-six boxers from 26 nations competed.

Medalists

Results

References

External links
Official Olympic Report
 

Lightweight